Fc fragment of IgG receptor IIb (coded by FCGR2B gene) is a low affinity inhibitory receptor for the Fc region of immunoglobulin gamma (IgG). FCGR2B participates in the phagocytosis of immune complexes and in the regulation of  antibody production by B lymphocytes.

Structure 
There are two major forms of FCGR2B existing (FCGR2B1 and FCGR2B2) and they are created by mRNA splicing mechanism, which results in the inclusion (FCGR2B1) or exclusion (FCGR2B2) of the C1 exon sequence. The presence of the C1 exon sequence (in FCGR2B1) results in tethering to the membrane of B cells, whereas its absence (in FCGR2B2) allows fast internalization of the receptor in myeloid cells. Both forms contain the Immunoreceptor Tyrosine-based Inhibitory Motif (ITIM) in their cytoplasmic regions. The extracellular domains are 95% identical to the domains of FCGR2A and almost completely identical to the FCGR2C (the other members of CD32 family).

Expression 
FCGR2B1 is highly expressed by B cells, and its mRNA has also been identified at lower levels on monocytes. FCGR2B2 is highly expressed on basophils and at low levels on monocytes. FCGR2B is co-expressed with the activating FCGRA on circulating myeloid dendritic cells in peripheral blood. Cytokine regulation of the expression is positive in the case of IL-10 and IL-6 and negative in the case of TNF-α, C5a and IFN-γ.

FCGR2B is co-expressed with the activating FCGRA on circulating myeloid dendritic cells.

Function 

The receptor inhibits the functions of activating FcγRs, such as phagocytosis and pro-inflammatory cytokine release, mainly by clustering of FCGR2B with different activating FCGR receptors or with the BCR by immune complexes.

The phosphorylated ITIM of FcγRIIB recruits the inositol phosphatases SHIP1 and SHIP2, which inhibit the Ras activation, downregulate MAPK activity and reduce PLCγ function and  lead to decreased activation of PKC. Inhibition of the MAP kinase pathway, together with the anti-apoptotic kinase Akt can negatively affect proliferation and survival of the cells.

FCGR2B regulates B cell activation by increasing the BCR activation threshold and suppressing B cell mediated antigen presentation to T cells through the ITIM-dependent inhibitory mechanism. Ligation of FCGR2B on B cells downregulates antibody production, prevents the membrane organization of BCR and CD19 and promotes apoptosis. Co-ligation of FCGR2B on dendritic cells inhibits maturation and blocks cell activation. .The negative regulatory role of the FCGRIIB molecule is not limited to BCR-induced B-cell activation, but is also functional on other B-cell activation pathways mediated by CD40 and IL-4.

FCGR2B expression on follicular dendritic cells (FDCs) is important for capturing the antigen-containing immune complexes which are essential for the germinal centre response.

FCGR2B is present on non-leukocyte cells including airway smooth muscle and liver sinusoidal endothelial cells, where small immune complexes are internalized inhibiting the pro-inflammatory signalling.

Autoimmunity 
FCGR2B is one of the genes thought to influence susceptibility to several autoimmune diseases in humans. Its decreased function is associated with systemic lupus erythematosus, rheumatoid arthritis, Goodpasture's disease, multiple sclerosis and others.

FCGR2B may be a target for monoclonal antibody therapy for autoimmune diseases as well as malignancies.

See also 
 CD32

References

Further reading

External links 
 

Glycoproteins
Clusters of differentiation
Fc receptors